3Xtreme is a racing game released for the PlayStation in 1999. As with 2Xtreme, 3Xtreme contains skateboarding, skating, and cycling options to reach the goal before opponent players.

Gameplay
In 3Xtreme, the players take part in specific events using skateboards, BMX or inline skates. With the simplistic nature of each stage, the focus is on doing tricks instead of pure driving. There are more than 22 courses, mostly taken from 2Xtreme. They include parks, subways, mountains and islands. Each trick, for which Dave Mirra and Andy MacDonald did motion-capture, can be linked into combos. Some of them are rail slides, board grabs and 360 degree turns. 3Xtreme rewards doing trick moves as good as possible by giving points, judging by how well they were performed. They can be used afterwards to upgrade the vehicles. The game contains several modes: exhibition (is used to prepare for the race against the opponents), freestyle (competition in who gets the most trick points), and season (playing through three circuits which unlocks some equipment and extra tracks).

Development
3Xtreme was developed by 989 Sports, with Ed Loonam as the product manager. The idea was to incorporate the speed pace from 1Xtreme, while keeping some fighting elements from 2Xtreme. Unlike the previous games in the series which used sprites, every in-game object was fully polygonal and all tracks were designed to be longer. The vehicles were based on real-life models from several manufacturers, such as Trek Bicycle Corporation, K2 Sports, GT Bicycles and Tum Yeto.

Sony spent millions of dollars marketing the game.

Reception

The game received unfavorable reviews according to the review aggregation website GameRankings. Next Generation said that the game was "yet another formula 'don't do much for the sequel, because they're gonna buy it anyway' production."

Notes

References

External links
 

1999 video games
BMX video games
Cycling video games
Multiplayer and single-player video games
Multiple-sport video games
North America-exclusive video games
PlayStation (console) games
PlayStation (console)-only games
Racing video games
Roller skating video games
Skateboarding video games
Snowboarding video games
Sony Interactive Entertainment games
Video games developed in the United States
Xtreme (video game series)